Valley of the Kings, subtitled A Graphics Adventure, is a  video game written by Thomas M. Krischan for the Atari 8-bit family and published by Dynacomp in 1982.

Gameplay
Valley of the Kings is a game in which the player navigates a maze of passages in ancient Egypt, obtaining valuable objects and fighting enemies.

Reception
David Stone reviewed the game for Computer Gaming World, and stated that "since  play-value is not derived from solving riddles and puzzles, but rather from maneuvering the onscreen character, there's plenty of fun to be had by replaying the adventure to try to beat your last score."

References

1982 video games
Action-adventure games
Atari 8-bit family games
Atari 8-bit family-only games
Top-down video games
Video games based on Egyptian mythology
Video games developed in the United States
Video games set in antiquity
Video games set in Egypt